The 1914 Montana football team represented the University of Montana in the 1914 college football season. They were led by second-year head coach A. George Heilman, played their home games at Dornblaser Field and finished the season with a record of seven wins, zero losses and one tie (7–0–1).

Schedule

 One game was played on Tuesday (against Washington State)and one on Thursday (against Gonzaga in Spokane on Thanksgiving)

References

Montana
Montana Grizzlies football seasons
College football undefeated seasons
Montana football